Ridala was a rural municipality of Estonia, in Lääne County.

In 2007 it was merged with the city of Haapsalu to establish the Haapsalu urban municipality.

Part of the parish is within the Matsalu National Park.

Populated places
Ridala Parish had two small boroughs and 56 villages.

 Small boroughs
Paralepa, Uuemõisa

 Villages
Aamse, Allika, Ammuta, Emmuvere, Erja, Espre, Haeska, Herjava, Hobulaiu, Jõõdre, Kabrametsa, Kadaka, Kaevere, Kiideva, Kiltsi, Kiviküla, Koheri, Koidu, Kolila, Kolu, Käpla, Laheva, Lannuste, Liivaküla, Litu, Lõbe, Metsaküla, Mäeküla, Mägari, Nõmme, Panga, Parila, Puiatu, Puise, Pusku, Põgari-Sassi, Rohense, Rohuküla, Rummu, Saanika, Saardu, Sepaküla, Sinalepa, Suure-Ahli, Tammiku, Tanska, Tuuru, Uneste, Uuemõisa, Valgevälja, Varni, Vilkla, Võnnu, Väike-Ahli, Vätse, Üsse.

See also
Matsalu National Park
Pullapää crisis

References

This article includes content from the Estonian Wikipedia article Ridala vald.

 
Former municipalities of Estonia